David "Dai" Jenkins (12 April 1904 – 13 August 1951) was a Welsh dual-code international rugby footballer who played rugby union for Swansea and rugby league for Leeds RLFC, and representing internationally in both sports.

Rugby career
Jenkins joined Swansea from Neath in 1924 and, while with Swansea, faced two touring international teams. In 1927 he played against the New Zealand Maori rugby union team, and then in 1927 the New South Wales Waratahs. Jenkins gained his first cap for Wales team when he was selected to face the Waratahs again in their 1927 tour. Jenkins's only other Welsh union cap was in the 1929 Five Nations Championship when he was chosen to face England on 19 January. Under the captaincy of Ivor Jones, Wales lost their eighth consecutive game at Twickenham with the final score 8–3 to England. Jenkins may have gained further caps but when the next Welsh game was played on 2 February 1929, Jenkins was playing rugby league for Leeds RLFC, having switched codes for £370, (based on increases in average earnings, this would be approximately £64,000 in 2018). He went on to represent against Australia in the 1929 Ashes series.

International matches played
Wales
  1929
  New South Wales Waratahs 1927

Note
It is often incorrectly assumed that David "Dai" Jenkins, Snr. was the father of the rugby league footballer, David "Dai" Jenkins, Jr. However, this is not the case, as Dai Jenkins, Jr. was actually the son of Richard Jenkins, and Rachel (née Howells) whose marriage was registered during third ¼ 1909 in Pontypridd district.

Bibliography

References

External links
!Great Britain Statistics at englandrl.co.uk (statistics currently missing due to not having appeared for both Great Britain, and England)
Statistics at en.espn.co.uk

1904 births
1951 deaths
Dual-code rugby internationals
Great Britain national rugby league team players
Leeds Rhinos players
Neath RFC players
Resolven RFC players
Rugby league players from Resolven
Rugby league props
Rugby union players from Resolven
Rugby union props
Swansea RFC players
Wales international rugby union players
Welsh rugby league players
Welsh rugby union players